Lucy Li (born October 1, 2002) is an American professional golfer. She currently holds records as the youngest qualifier for the U.S. Women's Amateur and the U.S. Women's Open. She is the second-youngest qualifier for the U.S. Women's Amateur Public Links, and the youngest ever to advance to match play in that event. Li was an age group winner at the inaugural Masters Drive, Chip, and Putt Championship in Augusta, Georgia. As of 2014, she is a student of Jim McLean.

Background
Born in Stanford, California, Li now lives in Redwood Shores, California. Her father, Warren Li, is a San Francisco Bay Area computer consultant and stockbroker. Her mother, Amy Zeng, is a former Hewlett-Packard employee. Warren and Amy were raised in China and moved to the United States from Australia in 1998. Warren has a Ph.D. in computer science, while Amy has a master's degree in the field. Lucy was born in 2002. She lived with her aunt Tao Zeng four months per year to train in Florida near Trump National Doral Miami and McLean's Golf School. Li is homeschooled. She performs some of her schoolwork through independent study in the months she is in Florida.

She was also active in gymnastics and music. Some sources claim that she began practicing at Mariners Point Golf Center at about age 4 or 5, with informal coaching from her mother and aunt. Other sources claim that she began playing golf at age 7 while watching her older brother Luke, a Princeton University student, who was hitting balls at a driving range. Li likes to tell the latter story, but Mariners Point head pro, Joby Ross, confirmed that at about 3 or 4 years old Li was very boisterous about her interest in the sport to the point of throwing tantrums when being asked to leave. At age 7 her parents called Jim McLean, who also coaches or has coached Lexi Thompson, Cristie Kerr, Keegan Bradley and Erik Compton, and arranged a visit to meet him at Doral. Afterwards, the family made summer living arrangements with her aunt. Then, McLean began working with her. Li's practice course is Cinnabar Hills in San Jose.

Amateur career
Li holds record for youngest match-play qualifier in U.S. Women's Amateur Public Links history (10 years, 8 months, 16 days), surpassing Michelle Wie's 2000 record by a mere 7 days. Li was the second-youngest qualifier in May 2013 for the U.S. Women's Amateur Public Links before becoming the youngest to advance to match play that June. The lone person younger than Li was Allisen Corpuz, who qualified in 2008.

She is also the youngest U.S. Women's Amateur qualifier, surpassing Latanna Stone's 2012 record age of 10 years, 11 months and 2 days by beginning the first day of the tournament at age 10 years, 10 months and 4 days old on August 5, 2013.

In 2014, at the first ever Drive, Chip and Putt Championship on the Sunday preceding the 78th edition Masters Tournament at Augusta National Golf Club, she won the Girls 10–11 age division. The event was televised on the Golf Channel and was sponsored by the United States Golf Association, Professional Golfers' Association of America and Augusta National to increase youth participation in the sport. Over 10,000 youth from over 110 sites participated in a qualification process that yielded 88 qualifiers from 8 age/gender brackets from each of 11 regions.

On May 19, 2014, she became the youngest (age 11) to qualify for the U.S. Women's Open, surpassing Thompson's record (12 years, 4 months, 18 days) from the 2007 Open. Notably, Li not only qualified, but she won her qualifying event by seven strokes at Old Course at Half Moon Bay Golf Links. Thompson missed the cut in 2007 with a 36-hole 168 total. Li was the second-youngest to compete; nine years prior to the introduction of qualification in 1976, Beverly Klass played in the 1967 Open at age 10 years, 7 months, and 21 days. Although Li's qualification was largely heralded, some were befuddled at the state of the sport when a sixth grader could even qualify for one of the most prestigious events of the year. Li, who had reached a 1.5 handicap by April, had a handicap better than threshold 2.4, making her eligible to participate in qualifications.

Li was 11 years, 8 months, and 19 days on June 19, the opening round of the 2014 U.S. Women's Open, held at Course No. 2 of Pinehurst Resort & Country Club. Edel Golf designed custom clubs that Golf Digest described as "blinged-out" for Li to use in the Open. In the first round on Thursday, Li shot a 78 (+8), which had been the highest score that anyone who made the cut in the 2013 Open had tallied. She followed that up with a second 78 on Friday for 156 (+16) and missed the cut by seven strokes. She then walked the course as a fan that Sunday. She scheduled an appearance in the July U.S. Women's Amateur Public Links in DuPont, Washington next. Li shot 74 and 70 to qualify for match play where she lost to Alice Chen in sudden-death of the first round after posting a stroke play equivalent of a 71. She did not schedule any other USGA events in 2014, deciding instead to play local events and be an 11-year-old. In 2015, she did not qualify for the 2015 U.S. Women's Open.

In August 2016, Li won the Junior PGA Championship. The following month, she was on the winning team for the 2016 Junior Ryder Cup.

She earned low amateur honors at the 2017 ANA Inspiration by being the only amateur to make the cut. She was named to the Junior Solheim Cup team for the United States, who won 14.5–9.5. In October she won The PING Invitational, and she won her next event, Rolex Tournament of Champions, in November.

On May 14 at the Contra Costa Country Club, Pleasant Hill, California, Li qualified for the 2018 U.S. Women's Open, where she was again the youngest player in the field. She was one of seven amateurs to make the cut, and she finished tied for 55th with a 299 (+11). Li was selected to represent the USA in the June 8–10, 2018 Curtis Cup. The United States won by the widest margin in the history of the event (17–3) and Li won her singles match against India Clyburn 5 and 4. At the 2018 U.S. Women's Amateur, Li was co-medalist and earned the number one seed for the match play portion of the event. She lost in the quarter-finals to eventual champion Kristen Gillman on the 19 hole. She contributed to the 2018 Junior Ryder Cup victory.

At the 2018 Summer Youth Olympics, Li teamed with Akshay Bhatia to win the mixed team silver medal.

In 2019, the USGA investigated Li's amateur status after she appeared in an Apple Watch advertisement. Rule 6:2 states: "even if no payment or compensation is received, an amateur golfer is deemed to receive a personal benefit by promoting, advertising or selling anything, or allowing his name or likeness to be used by a third party for the promotion, advertisement or sale of anything. A person who acts contrary to the rules may forfeit his amateur status and as a result will be ineligible to play in amateur competitions." She was given a warning but maintained her amateur status.

Li was named to the 2019 Junior Solheim Cup team.

Professional career
Li turned professional in late 2019. She had status on the Symetra Tour in 2020 through 2022.

Li's first USGA event as a professional was the U.S. Women's Open where she finished in a tie for 16th place at Olympic Club on June 6, 2021. This has been Li's best finish in a LPGA major event to date, and the $84,000 in prize money more than doubled her career tournament earnings.

Li's first professional victory on the Epson Tour came in a playoff with an eagle 3 on the first hole at Kinston Country Club's Carolina Golf Classic on June 12, 2022. She picked up her second win a month later at the Twin Bridges Championship in Albany, New York.

Li was the first Epson Tour player in 2022 to qualify for LPGA Tour who was then granted two consecutive LPGA sponsor exemptions in August. By finishing in the top-10 at the second event (CP Women's Open), Lucy automatically qualified for her third consecutive LPGA tournament, the Dana Open. Li was the leader after the second and third rounds, and was paired with Lexi Thompson, another former child prodigy, in the final grouping. After finishing fourth place, Li qualified for the Kroger Queen City Championship, her fourth straight LPGA tournament. She is now playing exclusively on the LPGA Tour.

Amateur wins
2016 Junior PGA Championship
2017 The PING Invitational, Rolex Tournament of Champions

Source:

Professional wins (2)

Epson Tour wins (2)

World ranking
Position in Women's World Golf Rankings at the end of each calendar year.

U.S. national team appearances
Amateur
Junior Ryder Cup: 2016 (winners), 2018 (winners)
Junior Solheim Cup: 2017 (winners), 2019 (winners)
Curtis Cup: 2018 (winners)

Source:

References

External links

American female golfers
Golfers at the 2018 Summer Youth Olympics
Golfers from California
American sportswomen of Chinese descent
People from Stanford, California
People from Redwood City, California
Sportspeople from the San Francisco Bay Area
2002 births
Living people
21st-century American women